Yeşilovacık Fishing Port is a small port in the town of Yeşilovacık, Turkey.
 
The economy of Yeşilovacık is partially based on fishing. The 250-small boat capacity harbor was constructed in 1997. It is situated to the east of a small bay named Ovacık Bay, north of the ancient site Aphrodisias of Cilicia and the south of the town. It is equipped by a harbor launch for small vessels.

In 2015 a cement silo was added to the harbor infrastructure . Presently the harbor is used mainly to import cement to supply the neighbor Akkuyu Nuclear Power Plant construction.

References

Ports and harbours of Turkey
Buildings and structures in Mersin Province
Silifke District
Buildings and structures completed in 1997
Transport in Mersin Province
1997 establishments in Turkey
Fishing in Turkey